Khandaker Nasirul Islam is a Bangladesh Nationalist Party politician and a Member of Parliament from Faridpur-1.

Career
Islam was elected to parliament from Faridpur-1 as an Bangladesh Nationalist Party candidate in 15 February 1996.

On 4 July 2005, 62 politicians of Bangladesh Nationalist Party, including Islam, were sued for attacking Awami League politicians during a visit by Kazi Siraj who had recently left Bangladesh Nationalist Party and joined Awami League.

References

Bangladesh Nationalist Party politicians
Date of birth missing (living people)
6th Jatiya Sangsad members